Hedwigiales is an order of mosses. It is named after Johannes Hedwig (1730-1799), the founder of modern bryology.

Description
They are a medium to large size acrocarpous moss with irregular branching. A midrib is not normally present in the leaves.

Classification
There are three families placed in the Hedwigiales.
Hedwigiaceae
Helicophyllaceae
Rhacocarpaceae

References

Moss orders
Bryopsida